Tercero Arriba Department is a department of Córdoba Province in Argentina.

The provincial subdivision has a population of about 107,460 inhabitants in an area of 5,187 km², and its capital city is Oliva, which is located around 620 km from Buenos Aires.

Settlements
Almafuerte
Colonia Almada
Corralito
Dalmacio Vélez Sarsfield
General Fotheringham
Hernando
James Craik
Las Isletillas
Las Perdices
Los Zorros
Oliva
Pampayasta Norte
Pampayasta Sud
Punta del Agua
Río Tercero
Tancacha
Villa Ascasubi

Departments of Córdoba Province, Argentina